Zamia lecointei is a species of plant in the family Zamiaceae. It is found in Brazil, Colombia, Peru, and Venezuela. It is threatened by habitat loss.

References

lecointei
Near threatened plants
Taxonomy articles created by Polbot
Taxa named by Adolpho Ducke